Black-eyed Susan may refer to:

Flowers 
 Rudbeckia hirta, a member of the sunflower tribe of the large family Asteraceae
 A number of other members of the genus Rudbeckia
 Hibiscus trionum in the family Malvaceae
 The black-eyed susan vine, Thunbergia alata, in the family Acanthaceae
 Some members of the Australian  plant genus Tetratheca, particularly Tetratheca hirsuta, a member of the family Elaeocarpaceae

Theatre and film 
 Black-Eyed Susan; or, All in the Downs, an 1829 play by Douglas William Jerrold
 Black-Eyed Susan (film), a 1913 film adaptation directed by Percy Nash
 Black-Eyed Susan (actress) (aka Susan Carlson), avant-garde stage actor

Music 
 "Black-eyed Susan" or "All in the Downs", is an sea song by John Gay (1685–1732), more fully titled "Sweet William's Farewell to Black-Eyed Susan"
 "Blackeyed Susan", a song by The Triffids from The Black Swan
 The Blackeyed Susans, an Australian band, named after the Triffids song
 Blackeyed Susan (band), a Philadelphia-area band formed by "Dizzy" Dean Davidson after he left Britny Fox in 1989
 "Black-eyed Susan", a Morrissey song released as a B-Side to "Sunny" and later on My Early Burglary Years
 "Black Eyed Susan", a Paul Westerberg song from his album 14 Songs
 "Black-Eyed Susan" (song), a 1994 song by Prairie Oyster
 "Black Eyed Susan", a song from the album Mockingbird Time by The Jayhawks

Others
another name for Sussex pond pudding
Black-Eyed Susan Stakes

See also 
 Susan